Dimitrije Cincar-Marković (Šabac, 6 September 1849 – Belgrade, 11 June 1903) was a Serbian politician serving as the Prime Minister of the Kingdom of Serbia, army general, Chief of General Staff, professor of war history and strategy.

As one of the closest associates of king Milan Obrenović from 1897 to 1900, he made a significant contribution to the great reform, enlargement, and promotion of the army of the Kingdom of Serbia, which enabled its success in the Balkan wars. Dimitrije Cincar-Marković took steps to combat the revolutionaries of the Bulgarian Exarchate who were terrorizing the Serbian population in Old Serbia and Macedonia. He brought the assassins of Grigoriy Schterbina to justice. He was killed in the May Coup of 11 June 1903.

He was awarded Order of Miloš the Great, Order of the White Eagle, Order of the Cross of Takovo, Knight's Cross of the Order of Franz Joseph, Order of Osmanieh, Order of the Medjidie, Commander of the Legion of Honour, Order of the Iron Crown, Serbian Golden and Silver Medal for bravery and other decorations and medals.

Selected works
 Uput za manevrovanje trupa, Belgrade, 1885.
 Uput za manevrovanje trupa, Belgrade, 1897.
 Vođenje trupa i služba po štabovima, Belgrade, 1886.
 Francuska stručna ocena nemačke konjice, Belgrade, 1882, pp. 323.

References

External links
 

1849 births
1903 deaths
19th-century Serbian people
Politicians from Šabac
Prime Ministers of Serbia
Serbian diplomats
Serbian generals
Members of the Serbian Academy of Sciences and Arts
Recipients of the Order of Franz Joseph
Recipients of the Order of the Cross of Takovo
Recipients of the Order of the Medjidie
Foreign ministers of Serbia